South Papua, officially the South Papua Province, is an Indonesian province located in the southern portion of Papua, following the borders of Papuan customary region of Anim Ha. Formally established on 11 November 2022 and including the four most southern regencies that were previously part of the province of Papua and before 11 December 2002 were all part of a larger Merauke Regency, it covers an area of 117,849.16 km2 and had a population of 522,215 according to the official estimates for mid 2022.

It shares land borders with the sovereign state of Papua New Guinea to the east, as well as the Indonesian provinces of Highland Papua and Central Papua to the north and northwest, respectively. South Papua also faces the Arafura Sea in the west and south, which is maritime border with Australia. The province comprises the Papuan customary region of Anim Ha. Merauke is the economic centre of South Papua, while its capital is Salor located in Kurik district, Merauke Regency, around 60 km from Merauke.

History 
Before the arrival of Europeans, the swamp area of ​​South Papua was inhabited by various tribes such as the Asmat, Marind, and Wambon who still maintain their ancestral traditions. The Marind tribe also known as the Malind used to live in groups along rivers in the Merauke region and live by hunting, gatherer, and gardening. In addition, the Marind people are also known as headhunters. The Marind people use boats across rivers and coasts to distant villages and behead their inhabitants. The Marind people would then go home with the heads of their victims to be preserved and celebrated.

In the 19th century, Europeans began to colonize the island of New Guinea. The island is divided in a straight line, the western part belonged to Dutch New Guinea region and the eastern part belonged to British New Guinea. The Marind often crossed the border to go headhunting, so in 1902 the Dutch established a military base at the eastern tip of South Papua to strengthen the border and eliminate this tradition. Because of its location near Maro River it was named Merauke. The Dutch also put Catholic mission in this base to spread their religion and help eliminate the tradition of headhunting. This caused Merauke to grow into a nown. Then Merauke became the capital of Afdeeling Zuid Nieuw Guinea or South New Guinea Province. During the Dutch colonial period, Javanese people were brought to Merauke to cultivate rice fields.

In addition to the Maro river, the Netherlands were also informed about another, larger river called the Digul River. The Dutch then sent an expedition in the 1920s, the idea emerged to use the interior of Papua as a detention camp. A suitable location is the headwaters of the Digul River in Boven Digoel which was later established as a camp called Tanah Merah. Dense forests and the Digul river coupled with malaria made it difficult for the prisoners to escape. Several figures have been detained there including Mohammad Hatta and Sutan Sjahrir. After the Dutch left in the 1960s, Tanah Merah became more populated eventually becaming the capital of Boven Digoel Regency.

In the 1960s, all of Dutch New Guinea was taken over by Indonesia. The former Zuid Nieuw Guinea was changed to Merauke Regency with its capital at Merauke. In 2002, Merauke Regency was divided into four regencies, Merauke, Mappi, Asmat, and Boven Digoel. The former territory of Merauke Regency was united into the province of South Papua on 25 July 2022 with the signing of the Law No. 14/2022. South Papua name was chosen instead of Anim Ha because the term was an endonym of the Marind meaning "true human", which referred to other tribes with the demeaning term of ikom. The term Anim Ha was originally used during Dutch rule, and would be demeaning to other tribes in southern Papua if used. The public reception towards South Papua was far more positive compared to the other new provinces of Central Papua and Highlands Papua, with local residents spreading a giant Indonesian flag in front of the regent office of Merauke after the province's establishment.

Politics

Administrative division 

South Papua is divided into four regencies (kabupaten), the least amount compared to other Indonesian provinces. Before 11 December 2002 all four of the current regencies comprised a single Merauke Regency, which was split into the present four regencies on that date.

</onlyinclude>

Culture 

The native Papuan people has a distinct culture and traditions that cannot be found in other parts of Indonesia. Coastal Papuans are usually more willing to accept modern influence into their daily lives, which in turn diminishes their original culture and traditions. Meanwhile, most inland Papuans still preserves their original culture and traditions, although their way of life over the past century are tied to the encroachment of modernity and globalization. Each Papuan tribe usually practices their own tradition and culture, which may differ greatly from one tribe to another.

One of the most well-known Papuan tradition is the stone burning tradition (Indonesian: Tradisi Bakar Batu), which is practiced by most Papuan tribes in the province. The stone burning tradition is an important tradition for all indigenous Papuans. For them, is a form of gratitude and a gathering place between residents of the village. This tradition is usually held when there are births, traditional marriages, the coronation of tribal chiefs, and the gathering of soldiers. It is usually carried out by indigenous Papuan people who live in the interior, such as in the Baliem Valley, Paniai, Nabire, Pegunungan Bintang, and others. other. The name of this tradition varies in each region. In Paniai, the stone burning tradition is called Gapiia. Meanwhile, in Wamena it is called Kit Oba Isogoa, while in Jayawijaya it is called Barapen. It is called the stone burning tradition because the stone is actually burned until it is hot. The function of the hot stone is to cook meat, Sweet potatoes, and vegetables on the basis of banana leaves which will be eaten by all residents at the ongoing event. In some remote Papuan communities who are Muslim or when welcoming Muslim guests, pork can be replaced with chicken or beef or mutton or can be cooked separately with pork. This is, for example, practiced by the Walesi community in Jayawijaya Regency to welcome the holy month of Ramadan.

Hunting as practiced by Marind people usually begin by traditional controlled burn of peatbog and swamps, it was then left for three days to a week for new shoots to grow, which will invite game animals such as deer, pigs, saham (kangaroos). Hunting party consisting of usually of 7-8 people, then go to the burned locations while bringing food and drink, ranging from tubers, sago, to drinking water, for several days. Temporary hut called bivak would be constructed from barks from Bus, a type of eucalyptus trees to form the walls and the roof made from Lontar leaves. As with many coastal communities from Moluccas to Papua, Sasi is practiced, which are markers usually constructed from wood and janur to mark the prohibition of harvesting either from land or sea for a period of time with the goal to preserve natural resources and for sustainable harvest. To open and close sasi regions such as forest, usually the Marind-Kanume mark with two arrows shot to the west and to the east to respect three clans that inhabited the area as well as other rituals which can take up to forty days. Violators of the prohibition would be punished with payment of Wati leaves and pigs. Failure of payments, will result in referral to local security officers to be put on trial.

Architecture 

The Korowai people from the Mappi Regency in southern Papua is one of the indigenous tribes in Papua that still adheres to the traditions of their ancestors, one of which is to build houses on top of trees. The Korowai people is one of the indigenous tribes in the interior of Papua that still maintains firmly the traditions of their ancestors, one of which is to build a house on a tall tree called Rumah Tinggi (lit. 'high house'). Some of the Korowai people's tree houses can even reach a height of 50 m above the ground. The Korowai people builds houses on top of trees to avoid wild animals and evil spirits. The Korowai people still believes in the myth of Laleo, a cruel demon who often attacks suddenly. Laleo is depicted as an undead that roams at night. According to the Korowai people, the higher the house, the safer it will be from Laleo's attacks. The rumah tinggi is built on big and sturdy trees as the foundation for its foundation. The tops of the trees are then deforested and used as houses. All materials come from nature, logs and boards are used for the roof and floor, while the walls are made of sago bark and wide leaves. The building process for a rumah tinggi usually takes seven days and lasts up to three years.

Cuisine 

The native Papuan food usually consists of roasted boar with Tubers such as sweet potato. The staple food of Papua and eastern Indonesia in general is sago, as the counterpart of central and western Indonesian cuisines that favour rice as their staple food. Sago is either processed as a pancake or sago congee called papeda, usually eaten with yellow soup made from tuna, red snapper or other fishes spiced with turmeric, lime, and other spices. On some coasts and lowlands on Papua, sago is the main ingredient to all the foods. Sagu bakar, sagu lempeng, and sagu bola, has become dishes that is well known to all Papua, especially on the custom folk culinary tradition on Mappi, Asmat and Mimika. Papeda is one of the sago foods that is rarely found. As Papua is considered as a non-Muslim majority regions, pork is readily available everywhere. In Papua, pig roast which consists of pork and yams are roasted in heated stones placed in a hole dug in the ground and covered with leaves; this cooking method is called bakar batu (burning the stone), and it is an important cultural and social event among Papuan people. The Marind people used this cooking method or using burning bomi thermite mound made by Macrotermes sp to cook a pizza-like dish called "Sagu Sef", which is made from dough from sago and coconut with sago grub and deer meat. Spices used can include shallot, garlic, coriander, pepper, and salt, which then mixed and covered with banana leaves, to cook it evenly hot stones or bomi would be put on top of the dish.

In the coastal regions, seafood is the main food for the local people. One of the famous sea foods from Papua is fish wrap (Indonesian: Ikan Bungkus). Wrapped fish in other areas is called Pepes ikan. Wrapped fish from Papua is known to be very fragrant. This is because there are additional bay leaves so that the mixture of spices is more fragrant and soaks into the fish meat. The basic ingredient of Papuan wrapped fish is sea fish, the most commonly used fish is milkfish. Milkfish is suitable for "wrap" because it has meat that does not crumble after processing. The spices are sliced or cut into pieces, namely, red and bird's eye chilies, bay leaves, tomatoes, galangal, and lemongrass stalks. While other spices are turmeric, garlic and red, red chilies, coriander, and hazelnut. The spices are first crushed and then mixed or smeared on the fish. The wrapping is in banana leaves. Udang selingkuh is a type of prawn dish native to Wamena and the surrounding area. Udang selingkuhis usually served grilled with minimal seasoning, which is only salt. The slightly sweet natural taste of this animal makes it quite salty. The serving of Udang selingkuh is usually accompanied by warm rice and papaya or kale. It is usually also served with the colo-colo sambal combination which has a spicy-sweet taste.

Common Papuan snacks are usually made out of sago. Kue bagea (also called sago cake) is a cake originating from Ternate in North Maluku, although it can also be found in Papua. It has a round shape and creamy color. Bagea has a hard consistency that can be softened in tea or water, to make it easier to chew. It is prepared using sago, a plant-based starch derived from the sago palm or sago cycad. Sagu Lempeng is a typical Papuan snacks that is made in the form of processed sago in the form of plates. Sagu Lempeng are also a favorite for travelers. But it is very difficult to find in places to eat because this bread is a family consumption and is usually eaten immediately after cooking. Making sago plates is as easy as making other breads. Sago is processed by baking it by printing rectangles or rectangles with iron which is ripe like white bread. Initially tasteless, but recently it has begun to vary with sugar to get a sweet taste. It has a tough texture and can be enjoyed by mixing it or dipping it in water to make it softer. Sago porridge is a type of porridge that are found in Papua. This porridge is usually eaten with yellow soup made of mackerel or tuna then seasoned with turmeric and lime. Sago porridge is sometimes also consumed with boiled tubers, such as those from cassava or sweet potato. Vegetable papaya flowers and sautéed kale are often served as side dishes to accompany the sago porridge. In the inland regions, Sago worms are usually served as a type of snack dish. Sago worms come from sago trunks which are cut and left to rot. The rotting stems cause the worms to come out. The shape of the sago worms varies, ranging from the smallest to the largest size of an adult's thumb. These sago caterpillars are usually eaten alive or cooked beforehand, such as stir-frying, cooking, frying and then skewered. But over time, the people of Papua used to process these sago caterpillars into sago caterpillar satay. To make satay from this sago caterpillar, the method is no different from making satay in general, namely on skewers with a skewer and grilled over hot coals.

Religion

See also

Papua
Central Papua
Highland Papua
West Papua

References

 

 
Provinces of Indonesia
States and territories established in 2022
2022 establishments in Indonesia